Ambyr C. Childers (born July 18, 1988) is an American actress known for her portrayal of Susan Atkins in the NBC crime drama Aquarius, Ashley Rucker in the Showtime crime drama Ray Donovan, and Candace Stone in the Lifetime/Netflix thriller series You.

Early life 
Childers was born in Cottonwood, Arizona, and raised in Murrieta, Riverside, California. She has two sisters. Childers attended Vista Murrieta High School.

Career 
After appearing in the 2003 film Dickie Roberts: Former Child Star, she played Colby Chandler on the daytime soap opera All My Children from 2006 to 2008. She also played Elizabeth "E" Dodd in The Master.

Childers and Kate Bosworth teamed up to co-create Ambyr Childers Jewelry, a new line of delicate pieces that mixes Childers's Native American heritage with Bosworth's "essential cool-girl vibe".

Childers starred as Candace Stone in Lifetime's television adaptation of You, which premiered on September 9, 2018. On December 3, 2018, it was announced that You would move to Netflix as a "Netflix Original" title, ahead of the premiere of the second season. On February 1, 2019, Deadline announced that Childers had been promoted to a series regular role, ahead of the second season's premiere. The second season was released on December 26, 2019.

Personal life 
Childers married film producer Randall Emmett in 2009. The couple had a daughter in 2010 and a second daughter in 2013. Emmett filed for legal separation in April 2015, and the couple divorced in December 2017.

Filmography

Film

Television

References

External links 

 Personal website
 
 Ambyr Childers Jewelry

1988 births
American film actresses
American soap opera actresses
American television actresses
Actresses from California
Living people
People from Murrieta, California
20th-century American actresses
21st-century American actresses
Actresses from Arizona
American child actresses
People from Yavapai County, Arizona